The Roman Catholic Archdiocese of Garoua is the Metropolitan See for the Ecclesiastical province of Garoua in Cameroon.

History
 January 9, 1947: Established as Apostolic Prefecture of Garoua from the Apostolic Vicariate of Foumban 
 March 24, 1953: Promoted as Apostolic Vicariate of Garoua 
 September 14, 1955: Promoted as Diocese of Garoua 
 March 18, 1982: Promoted as Metropolitan Archdiocese of Garoua

Special churches
The seat of the archbishop is the Cathédrale Sainte Thérèse in Garoua.

Bishops

Ordinaries
Prefect Apostolic of Garoua (Roman rite) 
Father Yves-Joseph-Marie Plumey, O.M.I. March 25, 1947  – March 24, 1953; see below
 Vicar Apostolic of Garoua (Roman rite)
Bishop Yves-Joseph-Marie Plumey, O.M.I. March 24, 1953  – September 14, 1955; see above & below
Bishop of Garoua (Roman rite)
Bishop Yves-Joseph-Marie Plumey, O.M.I. September 14, 1955  – March 18, 1982; see above & below
 Metropolitan Archbishops of Garoua (Roman rite)
 Archbishop Yves-Joseph-Marie Plumey, O.M.I. March 18, 1982  – March 17, 1984; see above
 Archbishop Christian Wiyghan Tumi March 17, 1984  – August 31, 1991 (Cardinal in 1988), appointed Archbishop of Douala
 Archbishop Antoine Ntalou since January 23, 1992

Coadjutor archbishop
Christian Wiyghan Tumi (1982-1984); future Cardinal

Auxiliary bishop
Jean-Marie-Joseph-Augustin Pasquier, O.M.I. (1969-1982), appointed Bishop of Ngaoundéré

Suffragan Dioceses
 Maroua–Mokolo
 Ngaoundéré
 Yagoua

See also
 Roman Catholicism in Cameroon

Sources
catholic-hierarchy
 GCatholic.org

Garoua
A